Cyllopsis pyracmon, or Nabokov's satyr, is a species of alpine, arctic, nymph, or satyr in the family Nymphalidae. It is found in North America.

Subspecies
 Cyllopsis pyracmon henshawi (W. H. Edwards, 1876) 
 Cyllopsis pyracmon pyracmon (Butler, 1867)

References

 Pelham, Jonathan P. (2008). "A catalogue of the butterflies of the United States and Canada with a complete bibliography of the descriptive and systematic literature". Journal of Research on the Lepidoptera, vol. 40, xiv + 658.

Further reading

 Arnett, Ross H. (2000). American Insects: A Handbook of the Insects of America North of Mexico. CRC Press.

Satyrini
Butterflies described in 1867